Cross Keys House is a historic plantation house located at Cross Keys, Union County, South Carolina.  It was built about 1812–1814, and is a two-story, five bay, brick Georgian Colonial style dwelling. It features a gabled roof with identical pairs of end chimneys, a massive raised first-story portico, and date stones carved with the date of the house's completion (1814), original owner's initials (B.B.), and crossed keys thought to be the insignia of the builder.

It was added to the National Register of Historic Places in 1971.

References

Plantation houses in South Carolina
Houses on the National Register of Historic Places in South Carolina
Georgian architecture in South Carolina
Houses completed in 1814
Houses in Union County, South Carolina
National Register of Historic Places in Union County, South Carolina